Mazocruz, also spelled Mazo Cruz, is a town and the capital of the Santa Rosa District in the El Collao Province, department of Puno, in the Peruvian Altiplano.

References

Populated places in the Puno Region